Rick Leach and Jim Pugh were the defending champions but did not compete that year.

Neil Broad and Gary Muller won in the final 6–7, 7–6, 6–4 against Jim Grabb and Patrick McEnroe.

Seeds
The top four seeded teams received byes into the second round.

Draw

Final

Top half

Bottom half

External links
 1989 Sovran Bank Classic Doubles draw

1989 Grand Prix (tennis)